John Patton Burgess (born 5 June 1948) is an American philosopher. He is John N. Woodhull Professor of Philosophy at Princeton University where he specializes in logic and philosophy of mathematics.

Education and career

Burgess received his Ph.D. from the University of California, Berkeley's Group in Logic and Methodology of Science. His interests include logic, philosophy of mathematics and metaethics. He is the author of numerous articles on logic and philosophy of mathematics. In 2012, he was elected a Fellow of the American Academy of Arts and Sciences. He is the brother of Barbara Burgess.

Selected publications 
 1997. A Subject with No Object: Strategies for Nominalistic Reconstrual of Mathematics (with Gideon Rosen), Oxford University Press. 
 2005. Fixing Frege, Princeton University Press. 
 2007. Computability and Logic (with George Boolos and Richard C. Jeffrey), Cambridge University Press. 
 2008. Mathematics, Models, and Modality: Selected Philosophical Essays, Cambridge University Press. 
 2009. Philosophical Logic, Princeton University Press. 
 2011. Truth (with Alexis Burgess), Princeton University Press. 
 2013. Saul Kripke: Puzzles and Mysteries .
 2015. Rigor and Structure, Oxford University Press.

References

External links 
 Home page
 John Burgess Video "The Necessity of Origin and the Origin of Necessity", Second Annual Saul Kripke Lecture, The CUNY Graduate Center, November 13th, 2012

American logicians
Princeton University faculty
Living people
Fellows of the American Academy of Arts and Sciences
1948 births